The Legal Research Foundation is a body affiliated with the Faculty of Law of the University of Auckland, New Zealand. It was founded in 1965 to foster legal research and links between the legal profession and the University. It publishes the New Zealand Law Review.

References

External links
Legal Research Foundation

Law-related professional associations
Law of New Zealand
Foundations based in New Zealand
1965 establishments in New Zealand
Legal research institutes